General Lucky Eluonye Onyenuchea Irabor   (born 5 October 1965) is a Nigerian army general and the current Chief of Defence Staff of Nigeria. He was appointed by Muhammadu Buhari on 26 January 2021.

Background
Irabor was born on 5 October 1965 in Aliokpu Agbor, Ika South Local Government Area of Delta State, Nigeria. He gained admission into the Nigerian Defence Academy (NDA) Kaduna as a member of the 34 Regular Course in 1983 and was commissioned Second Lieutenant on 28 June 1986 into the Signals Corps of the Nigerian Army.

Irabor attended military and civil courses both locally and abroad. He attended Armed Forces Command and Staff College, Jaji (AFCSC) for his Junior Staff Course in 1995 and Ghana Armed Forces Staff College, Teshi, Accra, Ghana for Senior Staff Course in 2000/2001 amongst others. He equally attended the National Defence College in Bangladesh in 2010 and Harvard Kennedy Schools of Government and Executive Education, the USA in 2012 and 2017 respectively. Irabor obtained a bachelor's degree in Engineering from Obafemi Awolowo University and holds two Masters Degrees from University of Ghana and Bangladesh University of Professionals, Dhaka.

Awards
In October 2022, a Nigerian national honour of Commander of the Order of the Federal Republic (CFR) was conferred on him by President Muhammadu Buhari.

References 

Living people
Nigerian generals
Obafemi Awolowo University alumni
University of Ghana alumni
Multinational Joint Task Force Commanders
1965 births